Yvonne Snir-Bönisch (born 29 December 1980 in Ludwigsfelde, East Germany) is a German judo coach and former judoka. She retired in 2008.

She won a gold medal in the lightweight division (57 kg) at the 2004 Summer Olympics and was a two-times world championship finalist (2003 and 2005).
Her beginnings with judo happened at JV Ludwigsfelde.

Bönisch coached at UJKC Potsdam. She moved to Israel in January 2017 and was a coach with the women's national team until end of 2020. Since 1.1.2021 she is the head coach of the Austrian JudoTeam and responsible for men and women.
At the Tokyo Olympics her athletes won 2 medals. Silver for Michaela Polleres (-70kg) and Bronze for Shamil Borchashvili (-81kg).

References

External links

 
 
 
 

1980 births
Living people
People from Ludwigsfelde
People from Bezirk Potsdam
German female judoka
Sportspeople from Brandenburg
Judoka at the 2004 Summer Olympics
Judoka at the 2008 Summer Olympics
Olympic judoka of Germany
Olympic gold medalists for Germany
Olympic medalists in judo
Medalists at the 2004 Summer Olympics
Recipients of the Silver Laurel Leaf
21st-century German women